Cherven Bryag Municipality is a municipality (obshtina) in  Pleven Province, northwestern Bulgaria. It is named after its administrative centre - the town of Cherven Bryag. With a population of 30,524, as of December 2009, it is the second largest municipality in the province.

The municipality is located by the right side of the Iskar River, close to the inlet of Zlatna Panega River.

It borders with Lukovit, Roman, Dolni Dabnik, Iskar, Knezha and Byala Slatina municipalities. The Sofia - Rousse highway and Sofia-Varna railroad pass through municipality.

The municipality has 37 protected areas, including Kuklite ("The Dolls") rock formations on the lands of Resselets village; Kaleto tectonic ridge on the lands of Reselets village; Skoka waterfall on the lands of Reselets; Haydoushka cave near Deventsi; Sedlarkata Rock Bridge on the lands of Rakita; Neolithic settlements near Telish, Thracian settlements in Chomakovtsi, Roman cites near Resselets and Chomakovtsi.

Settlements

Demography 
The following table shows the change of the population during the last four decades.

Religion 
According to the latest Bulgarian census of 2011, the religious composition, among those who answered the optional question on religious identification, was the following:

See also
Provinces of Bulgaria
Municipalities of Bulgaria
List of cities and towns in Bulgaria

References

Municipalities in Pleven Province